Steve Twigger is an English musician, best known as the guitarist of the Celtic band Gaelic Storm.

Early life
Twigger was born in Coventry, England.

Career 
In 1986 he met a singer-songwriter from Boston and formed an alternative pop band Woodies. After moving to California, he worked in Los Angeles designing movie posters for the Hollywood studios.

In 1997, he appeared in the film Titanic as part of the steerage band, performing "An Irish Party in Third Class". This appearance catapulted the band into the touring scene.

References

External links 
 

Living people
English folk guitarists
English rock guitarists
English male guitarists
Gaelic Storm members
Year of birth missing (living people)